Kim Won-seok is a South Korean television director. He directed Sungkyunkwan Scandal (2010), Monstar (2013), Misaeng (2014), Signal (2016), My Mister (2018) and Arthdal Chronicles (2019).

Career
Kim Won-seok began his television career in 2001 as an assistant director for the Korean Broadcasting System (KBS) network. He was promoted to second unit director in 2005, and honed his skills on series of diverse genres. He also directed two episodes for the single-episode anthology Drama City in 2007, GOD (which he co-wrote) and The Dual Accounts Murder.

Kim's first television drama series as the head production director was "fusion" historical drama Sungkyunkwan Scandal in 2010. Based on Jung Eun-gwol's bestselling 2007 novel The Lives of Sungkyunkwan Confucian Scholars, it depicted the friendship and love that develops between four classmates (including a girl disguised as a boy) attending Sungkyunkwan, Joseon's highest educational institute where no women were allowed. Despite solid but unspectacular viewership ratings in the mid-teens, Sungkyunkwan Scandal became a cult hit among younger viewers, resulting in increased popularity for its cast Park Min-young, Park Yoo-chun, Yoo Ah-in and Song Joong-ki, and several trophies at the 2010 KBS Drama Awards. Kim won Best New Television Director at the 47th Baeksang Arts Awards, and Best Production Director at the 4th Korea Drama Awards.

Kim left KBS and in August 2011, he signed with media conglomerate CJ E&M, which owns cable channels Mnet and tvN. His first project post-move was a 30-minute music video for Superstar K3 starring the reality show's remaining contestants, titled Superstar K3: The Beginning. Then inspired by the American show Glee, Kim directed Mnet's first-ever musical drama, Monstar in 2013. It was Kim's third time to collaborate with screenwriter Kim Tae-hee (after The Dual Accounts Murder and Sungkyunkwan Scandal). Auditions were held, and Kim cast rookie actress Ha Yeon-soo, K-pop singer Yong Jun-hyung and stage actor Kang Ha-neul in the lead roles.

When tvN announced that Kim would next adapt Yoon Tae-ho's webtoon Misaeng (lit. "Incomplete Life") about a former baduk player who becomes an office temp worker at a trading company, it became one of the most anticipated Korean TV series of 2014. The workplace dramedy Misaeng had no A-list stars (its cast was led by Yim Si-wan and Lee Sung-min), but it struck a chord among viewers and critics, unexpectedly becoming a huge ratings hit for cable and a pop culture phenomenon. Kim said, "As cartoonist Yoon said he had rejected every offer from major broadcasters who wanted to dramatize his cartoon because they wanted to insert a love-hate relationship as dramatic devices for TV version. But I told him we wouldn't do that. We, instead, focused more on life of ordinary people like the original cartoon to give glimpse at office life. [...] I wanted to make a realistic drama about ordinary people." Misaeng won the Grand Prize (Daesang) at the 9th Cable TV Broadcasting Awards, while Kim won Best Television Director at the 51st Baeksang Arts Awards, beating nominees from terrestrial channels.

Kim next cast Lee Je-hoon, Kim Hye-soo and Cho Jin-woong in Signal, based on the real-life unsolved serial rape-murders of ten women in the city of Hwaseong between 1986 and 1991 (the case also inspired Memories of Murder and Gap-dong). In Signal, detectives from the present and the past communicate across time and space through a two-way radio to solve the crimes. The series was a critical and commercial success, and is currently the second highest-rated drama in Korean cable television history. Signal won several awards from award-giving bodies including Best Drama at the 52nd Baeksang Arts Awards.

From 2016 to 2019, Kim was under Studio Dragon, the production company spun off from CJ E&M. In December 2019, he resigned from the company due to personal reasons.

In January 2020, The JoongAng Ilbo published an exclusive report that stated Kim has joined Kakao M's soon-to-be-launched new drama production subsidiary to be led by former Studio Dragon and CJ E&M executive Park Ho-sik. Seven months later, the company, Baram Pictures, was officially launched.

Filmography

As assistant director 
School 4 (KBS2, 2001–2002)
Immortal Admiral Yi Sun-sin (KBS1, 2004–2005)
18 vs. 29 (KBS2, 2005)

As second unit director 
Hometown Station (KBS1, 2005–2006)
As the River Flows (KBS1, 2006)
King Sejong the Great (KBS1, 2008)
Partner (KBS2, 2009)
Cinderella's Sister (KBS2, 2010)

As director 
Drama City "GOD" (KBS2, 2007) (also credited as screenwriter)
Drama City "The Dual Accounts Murder" (KBS2, 2007)
Sungkyunkwan Scandal (KBS2, 2010)
Monstar (Mnet, 2013)
Misaeng (tvN, 2014)
Culture Day, Zipcon (Naver TV Cast, 2015)
Signal (tvN, 2016)
My Mister (tvN, 2018)
Arthdal Chronicles (tvN, 2019)

Awards and nominations

Notes

References

External links 
 
 

Living people
1966 births
South Korean television directors